Markus Fuchs may refer to:

 Markus Fuchs (equestrian) (born 1955), Swiss show jumper
 Markus Fuchs (footballer) (born 1980), German footballer
 Markus Fuchs (sprinter) (born 1995), Austrian sprinter